Chunkey (also known as chunky, chenco,  tchung-kee or the hoop and stick game )  is a game of Native American origin. It was played by rolling disc-shaped stones across the ground and throwing spears at them in an attempt to land the spear as close to the stopped stone as possible. It originated around 600 CE in the Cahokia region of what is now the United States (near modern St. Louis, Missouri). Chunkey was played in huge arenas as large as 47 acres (19 ha) that housed great audiences designed to bring people of the region together (i.e. Cahokians, farmers, immigrants, and even visitors). It continued to be played after the fall of the Mississippian culture around 1500 CE. Variations were played throughout North America. Early ethnographer James Adair translated the name to mean "running hard labor". Gambling was frequently connected with the game, with some players wagering everything they owned on the outcome of the game. Losers were even known to commit suicide.

Graphic representation

The falcon dancer/warrior/chunkey player was an important mythological figure from the Southeastern Ceremonial Complex. Many different representations of the theme have been found all over the American Southeast and Midwest. Throughout the many different centuries of its portrayal, certain distinct motifs are repeated:
stance – Many graphic representations of the chunkey player show the participant in the act of tossing the stone roller.
broken stick – The chunkey stick is usually shown as a stripped stick, almost always broken. In the mythological cycle, this may signify that the game is over, if not defeat itself. Chunkey sticks are usually not found in archaeological excavations, although a copper sheath found next to chunkey stones at Cahokias Mound 72 may be an exception.
pillbox hat – A cylindral shaped hat composed of unknown materials, only seen on chunkey players.
heart/bellows shaped apron – Archaeologists theorize that this may be the graphic representation of a human scalp attached to the belt of the figure. This motif seems to echo the beaded forelock, hair style (head shaved except for top-knot) and other attachments (shell, stone and copper ornaments) usually worn by mythological figures on their heads.
Mangum Flounce – An oddly shaped motif consisting of looping lines hanging above and below the belt of the chunkey player. Named for a Mississippian copper plate found at the Mangum Mound Site in Claiborne County, Mississippi which includes the motif.

Although the figure described as the falcon dancer/warrior/chunkey player is not always shown in the act of playing chunkey, the placing of many of the motifs helps identify them as the same figure. Some motifs usually associated with the figure, such as the scalp, severed heads, broken chunkey sticks, and the ethnohistoric record associating it with gambling, seem to indicate the seriousness of the game. The price of defeat in the mythological record may have been the forfeiture of one's life and head.

Post-European contact

Many Native Americans continued playing the chunkey game long after European contact, including the Muscogee (Creeks), Chickasaw, Choctaw, and the Mandans, as witnessed by the artist George Catlin in 1832,

In the early colonial era, it was still the most popular game among American Indians of the Southeast. Muscogee chunkey yards were a large carefully cleared and leveled area, surrounded by embankments on either side, with a pole in the center, and possibly two more at either end. The poles were used for playing another indigenous game, the ball game. The stones, valuable objects in themselves, were owned by the town or clans, not by individuals, and would be carefully preserved.
 Cherokees scored their game in terms of how close the stone was to certain marks on the chunkey stick.
 Chickasaws scored their game with a point for the person nearest the disc, two if it was touching the disc.
Poles were made of hickory wood, with four notches on the front end, one in the middle, and two at the other end. The score depended on which set of notches was closest to the disc. The game ended when a player had reached twelve points.

Gallery

See also
Hoop rolling

References

Further reading
 Hudson, Charles M., " The Southeastern Indians",   University of Tennessee Press, 1976. 
 Pauketat, Timothy R.; Loren, Diana DiPaolo (Ed.) (December 1, 2004) North American Archaeology. Malden, Massachusetts: Blackwell Publishing. .

External links

 Catlin at the Smithsonian

Mississippian culture
Native American sports and games
Ancient sports
Throwing sports